The Denby House is a historic raised cottage in Mobile, Alabama.  The one-story brick house was built by Charles Denby in 1873. It was added to the National Register of Historic Places on January 5, 1984.  In addition to being listed individually on the National Register of Historic Places, it is also a contributing building to the Lower Dauphin Street Historic District.

References

National Register of Historic Places in Mobile, Alabama
Houses on the National Register of Historic Places in Alabama
Houses in Mobile, Alabama
Houses completed in 1873